The following is a list of characters from the Procter & Gamble daytime soap opera The Edge of Night, which ran from 1956 to 1984.

References 

Lists of soap opera characters by series